So Fresh: The Hits of Autumn 2004  is a compilation of songs that were popular in Australia in autumn 2004.

Track listing
 Shannon Noll – "What About Me" (3:20)
 Outkast – "Hey Ya!" (3:57)
 Delta Goodrem – "Predictable" (3:38)
 The Black Eyed Peas – "Shut Up" (3:47)
 Guy Sebastian – "Angels Brought Me Here" (3:58)
 Kylie Minogue – "Red Blooded Woman" (4:19)
 Limp Bizkit – "Behind Blue Eyes" (4:31)
 Kelly Clarkson – "The Trouble with Love Is" (3:40)
 Nickelback – "Figured You Out" (3:49)
 Martin Solveig – "Rocking Music" (3:38)
 Fatman Scoop featuring The Crooklyn Clan – "Be Faithful" (2:42)
 Beyoncé – "Me, Myself and I" (3:58)
 Christina Aguilera – "The Voice Within" (4:25)
 Powderfinger – "Sunsets" (3:51)
 Pink – "God Is a DJ" (3:46)
 Hilary Duff – "Come Clean" (3:35)
 D.Kay & Epsilon featuring Stamina MC – "Barcelona" (3:31)
 Justin Timberlake – "I'm Lovin' It" (3:43)
 Junior Senior – "Rhythm Bandits" (2:51)
 Mercury4 – "5 Years from Now" (3:46)

Charts

See also
So Fresh

References

External links
 Official site

So Fresh albums
2004 compilation albums
2004 in Australian music